Basim is a rural locality (a settlement) and the administrative center of Basimskoye Rural Settlement, Solikamsky District, Perm Krai, Russia. The population was 461 as of 2010. There are 8 streets.

Geography 
Basim is located 92 km west of Solikamsk (the district's administrative centre) by road. Urolka is the nearest rural locality.

References 

Rural localities in Solikamsky District